MTD may refer to:

Medicine 
 Maximum tolerated dose, in drug development
 Muscle tension dysphonia, hyperfunctional musculature causing a hoarse voice

Organizations 
 Makkal Tamil Desam Katchi (People's Tamil Land Party), a political party in Tamil Nadu, India
 Metal Trades Department of the AFL-CIO
 Michael Tobias Design, a manufacturer of electric bass guitars
 Movimiento de Trabajadores Desempleados, a type of unemployed worker's organization in Argentina
 MTD Products, a manufacturer of outdoor power equipment for the mass market

Technology 
 Memory technology device, a type of device file in Linux for interacting with flash memory
 Metadynamics, a computer simulation method in computational physics, chemistry and biology
 MTD (mobile network), a former manual mobile network in Sweden, Norway and Denmark

Other uses 
 Making Tax Digital a UK Government initiative of HMRC
 A mass transit district, such as the Champaign-Urbana Mass Transit District
 Month-To-Date, a time period used in business and accounting
 Moralistic therapeutic deism
 MTD(f), a minimax search algorithm